Barbara St. Hilaire, better known by her nickname Old Grandma Hardcore is an American citizen from Mantua, Ohio. She has become best known for her interest in video games and her excessive preoccupation with them even at her "high" age of 71. She has admitted to playing about 10 hours-a-day.

She has a frequently viewed blog named "Old Grandma Hardcore" where she gives tips and hints to certain games, among other things. Her 24-year-old grandson, Timothy helps her with her website.

In December 2005, she was hired by MTV as their "senior" video game correspondent and host for the show The G-Hole. On 2006-09-09 Old Granny Hardcore won the Nintendo World Store's "Coolest Grandparent of the year" Brain Age contest.

In August 2006 she was featured on Attack of the Show covering "Women and Gaming".

She is known for her constant use of swearing while playing games. She is also known for having a very large collection of Xbox live arcade games.

External links 
 Old Grandma Hardcore
 MTV Games
 BusinessWeek article featuring Barbara St. Hilaire
 "Old Grandma Hardcore" Slashdot

1936 births
Living people
Writers from Cleveland
American bloggers
Video game blogs
People from Mantua, Ohio